This page lists Japan-related articles with romanized titles beginning with the letter A. For names of people, please list by surname (i.e., "Tarō Yamada" should be listed under "Y", not "T"). Please also ignore particles (e.g. "a", "an", "the") when listing articles (i.e., "A City with No People" should be listed under "City").

A
A.I. Love You

Ab
Aba, Okayama
Abashiri, Hokkaidō
Abashiri Subprefecture
ABCL/1
ABCL/R
ABCL/R2
Abe clan of Mikawa
Hiroshi Abe (actor)
Hiroshi Abe (astronomer)
Abe Iso
Kōbō Abe
Abe Masakatsu
Abe no Hirafu
Abe no Seimei
Nobuyuki Abe
Sada Abe
Yutaka Abe
Abe River
Shintaro Abe
Shinzō Abe
Abenobashi Magical Shopping District
Abiko, Chiba
Abolition of the han system
Abu District, Yamaguchi
Abu, Yamaguchi
Abukuma River
Abura kiri

Ac
Acala
Ace File
ActRaiser
Acura

Ad
AD Police
Adachi clan
Adachi Kagemori
Adachi Morinaga
Adachi, Tokyo
Adogawa, Shiga
Adventure Island 2

Af
After Life (film)

Ag
Hiromitsu Agatsuma
Agawa District, Kōchi
Agawa, Kōchi
Age District, Mie
Agedashi tofu
Agemono nabe
Ageo, Saitama
Ago, Mie
Agui, Aichi
Agumon
Aguni, Okinawa

Ai
Aibo
Aichi B7A
Aichi D3A
Aichi District, Aichi
Aichi Kokuki KK
Aichi M6A
Aichi Prefecture
Aida District, Okayama
Aida, Okayama
Show Aikawa
Aiki Jinja
Aikido
Aikido Doshu
Aikijutsu
Aikikai Hombu Dojo
Aiko
Aim for the Ace!
Aimi, Tottori
Minako Aino
Ainu people
Ainu language
Aio, Yamaguchi
Aioi, Hyōgo
Aioi, Tokushima
Air Nippon
Aira District, Kagoshima
Aira, Kagoshima
Aira, Kagoshima (Aira District)
Aira, Kagoshima (Kimotsuki District)
Aisai, Aichi
Aito, Shiga
Aiwa
Aizu
Aizumi, Tokushima
Aizuwakamatsu

Aj
Aja Kong
Aji, Kagawa
Ajimu, Oita
Ajisu, Yamaguchi

Ak
Aka, Fukuoka
Akabira
Akagi (manga)
Akagi (train)
Akagi, Gunma
Akagi, Shimane
Kei Akagi
Ritsuko Akagi
Akahata
Akaike, Fukuoka
Akaishi Mountains
Akaiwa District, Okayama
Ken Akamatsu
Akan National Park
Akan, Hokkaido
Akaoka, Kōchi
Akasaka, Okayama
Akasaki, Tottori
Genpei Akasegawa
Akashi, Hyōgo
Akashi Morishige
Akashi-Kaikyo Bridge
Akashiyaki
Akaza Naoyasu
Akebono Tarō
Akechi Mitsuharu
Akechi Mitsuhide
Akechi, Gifu
Akehama, Ehime
Aki District, Kōchi
Aki District, Hiroshima
Aki Province
Aki, Kōchi
Aki, Oita
Akihabara
Akihabara Station
Akihito
Akira (manga)
Akira (1988 film)
Akiruno, Tokyo
Akishima, Tokyo
Akita clan
Akita Inu
Akita Prefecture
Akita Sanesue
Akita Toshisue
Akita, Akita
Akitsu, Hiroshima
Akiyama Nobutomo
Akiyama Saneyuki
Toshiko Akiyoshi
Akizuki Tanenaga
Akizuki Tanezane
Akō, Hyōgo
Ako District, Hyogo
Akuma
Akuma (Street Fighter)
Akune, Kagoshima
Akutagawa Prize
Ryūnosuke Akutagawa

Al
Albirex Niigata
Alex Kidd
Alex Kidd BMX Trial
Alex Kidd in Miracle World
Alex Kidd in Shinobi World
All Japan Kendo Federation
All Monsters Attack
All Night Nippon Super Mario Bros.
All Nippon Airways
All Nippon Airways Flight 61
All Purpose Cultural Cat Girl Nuku Nuku
All your base are belong to us
Altaic languages

Am
Ama District, Aichi
Ama, Shimane
Ame-no-Uzume
Amagasaki, Hyogo
Amagase, Ōita
Amagi, Fukuoka
Amago clan
Amago Haruhisa
Amago Katsuhisa
Amago Kunihisa
Amago Okihisa
Amago Tsunehisa
Amago Yoshihisa
Amakasu Kagemochi
Amakusa
Amakusa District, Kumamoto
Amakusa Shirō
Amakusa, Kumamoto
Amami rabbit
Amanattō
Yoshitaka Amano
Amata District, Kyoto
Amaterasu
Amazake
Amazing 3
Amerikamura
Ami shakushi
Ami Yoshida

An
Anabuki, Tokushima
Korechika Anami
Anan, Tokushima
Ando, Nara
Toshiyuki Ando
Android 18
Hidetsugu Aneha
Angel Sanctuary
Angelic Layer
Nippon Sei Ko Kai
Anguirus
The Animatrix
Anime
Anime Complex
Anime International Company
Aniplex
Anjo, Aichi
Anmitsu
Annaka
Hideaki Anno
Ano, Mie
Anpachi District, Gifu
Anpachi, Gifu
Anpan
Anpanman
Ansei Purge
Anti-Comintern Pact

Ao
Aoimori Railway Line
Aogaki, Hyogo
Aomori
Aomori, Aomori
Aomori Prefecture
Aoya, Tottori
Aoyama, Mie
Gosho Aoyama
Aozora Bunko

Ap
APNIC

Ar
Arahata Kanson
Arahitogami
Arai, Niigata
Arai Akino
Arai Hakuseki
Arai, Shizuoka
Arakawa, Tokyo
Shizuka Arakawa
Sadao Araki
Arao, Kumamoto
Arashi
Arashiyama
Arata
Ariake, Kagoshima
Ariake, Kumamoto
Ariake, Saga
Arida District, Wakayama
Arida, Wakayama
Arisaka
Arishima Takeo
Arita, Saga
Arkanoid
Arlong
Art and architecture of Japan
Art of Fighting
Art-name
Artemis (Sailor Moon)
Artepiazza
Article 9 of the Japanese Constitution
Articuno
Arts of the Far East

As
Asa District, Yamaguchi
Asaba, Shizuoka
Asagiri, Kumamoto
Asago District, Hyogo
Asago, Hyogo
Shoko Asahara
Asahi
Asahi Breweries
Asahi Camera
Asahi Glass Co.
Asahi Kasei
Asahi Shimbun
Asahi, Aichi
Asahi, Chiba
Asahi, Fukui
Asahi, Gifu
Asahi, Hokkaidō
Asahi, Ibaraki
Asahi, Mie
Asahi, Nagano
Asahi, Niigata
Asahi, Okayama
Asahi, Shimane
Asahi, Toyama
Asahi, Yamagata (Nishimurayama)
Asahi, Yamagata (Higashitagawa)
Asahi, Yamaguchi
Asahi-ku, Osaka
Asahikawa, Hokkaidō
Asahikawa Airport
Asaji, Ōita
Asaka Yasuhiko
Asaka, Saitama
Yu Asakawa
Asakiyumemishi
Asakuchi District, Okayama
Asakura District, Fukuoka
Asakura, Ehime
Asakura, Fukuoka
Asakusa
Asama (Shinkansen)
Kia Asamiya
Asano Sōichirō
Tadanobu Asano
Asashoryu Akinori
ASCII (magazine)
Ashibetsu, Hokkaidō
Hitoshi Ashida
Ashigaru
Ashikaga clan
Ashikaga clan (Fujiwara)
Ashikaga era
Ashikaga Institute of Technology
Ashikaga Junior College
Ashikaga murder case
Ashikaga shogunate
Ashikaga Station
Ashikaga Takauji
Ashikaga, Tochigi
Ashikaga Yoshiaki
Ashikaga Yoshiakira
Ashikaga Yoshiharu
Ashikaga Yoshihide
Ashikaga Yoshihisa
Ashikaga Yoshikatsu
Ashikaga Yoshikazu
Ashikaga Yoshimasa
Ashikaga Yoshimitsu
Ashikaga Yoshimochi
Ashikaga Yoshinori
Ashikaga Yoshitane
Ashikaga Yoshiteru
Ashikaga Yoshizumi
Ashikari, Saga
Ashikita District, Kumamoto
Ashikita, Kumamoto
Ashiya, Fukuoka
Ashiya, Hyōgo
Asian Cup 1992
ASIMO
Aso District, Kumamoto
Kumiko Asō
Aso, Kumamoto
Assistant Language Teacher
Astro Boy
Asuka period
Asuka, Nara
Asuke, Aichi

At
Atami, Shizuoka
Atetsu District, Okayama
Atlus
Ato, Yamaguchi
Attack on Pearl Harbor
Atsugi, Kanagawa
Atsumi District, Aichi
Atsumi, Aichi
Kiyoshi Atsumi

Au
Audition (1999 film)
Aum Shinrikyo

Av
Avispa Fukuoka

Aw
Awa District, Tokushima
Awa Province (Chiba)
Awa Province (Tokushima)
Awa, Tokushima
Awaji Island
Awaji Province
Awaji, Hyogo
Awara, Fukui

Ay
Aya, Miyazaki
Ayabe, Kyoto
Ayakami, Kagawa
Ayama District, Mie
Ayama, Mie
Haruka Ayase
Ayase, Kanagawa
Ayauta District, Kagawa
Ayauta, Kagawa

Az
Azai Hisamasa
Azai Nagamasa
Azai Sukemasa
Azai, Shiga
Myū Azama
Azuchi-Momoyama period
Azuchi, Shiga
Azuki bean
Kiyohiko Azuma
Azuma, Gunma (Agatsuma)
Azuma, Gunma (Sawa)
Azuma, Gunma (Seta)
Azuma, Kagoshima
Azumanga Daioh

A